Chamaelaucium confertiflorum is a member of the family Myrtaceae endemic to Western Australia.

It blooms between October and December producing white flowers.

Found in the Great Southern region of Western Australia where it grows in sandy or peaty soils.

References

confertiflorum
Plants described in 1923